The BCI Award is an annual award for innovative research in the field of brain-computer interfaces. It is organized by the BCI Award Foundation. The prize is $3000 for first, $2000 for second, and $1000 for third place. The prizes are provided by g.tec medical engineering, Cortec, Intheon and IEEE Brain.. Christoph Guger and Dean Krusienski are the chairmen of the Foundation.

In 2017 the awards were made during the Graz Brain-Computer Interface Conference at the Institute of Neural Engineering of Graz University of Technology in Graz, Austria.

Past winners 
The following list presents the first-place winners of the Annual BCI Research Award:
 2010: Cuntai Guan, Kai Keng Ang, Karen Sui Geok Chua and Beng Ti Ang
 "Motor imagery-based Brain-Computer Interface robotic rehabilitation for stroke"
 2011: Moritz Grosse-Wentrup and Bernhard Schölkopf
 "What are the neuro-physiological causes of performance variations in brain-computer interfacing?"
 2012: Surjo R. Soekadar and Niels Birbaumer
 "Improving Efficacy of Ipsilesional Brain-Computer Interface Training in Neurorehabilitation of Chronic Stroke"
 2013: M. C. Dadarlat, J. E. O'Doherty, P. N. Sabes
 "A learning-based approach to artificial sensory feedback: intracortical microstimulation replaces and augments vision"
2014: Katsuhiko Hamada, Hiromu Mori, Hiroyuki Shinoda, Tomasz M. Rutkowski
 "Airborne Ultrasonic Tactile Display BCI"
2015: Guy Hotson, David P McMullen, Matthew S. Fifer, Matthew S. Johannes, Kapil D. Katyal, Matthew P. Para, Robert Armiger, William S. Anderson, Nitish V. Thakor, Brock A. Wester, Nathan E. Crone
 "Individual Finger Control of the Modular Prosthetic Limb using High-Density Electrocorticography in a Human Subject" 
2016: Gaurav Sharma, Nick Annetta, Dave Friedenberg, Marcie Bockbrader, Ammar Shaikhouni, W. Mysiw, Chad Bouton, Ali Rezai
 "An Implanted BCI for Real-Time Cortical Control of Functional Wrist and Finger Movements in a Human with Quadriplegia"
2017: S. Aliakbaryhosseinabadi, E. N. Kamavuako, N. Jiang, D. Farina, N. Mrachacz-Kersting
 "Online adaptive brain-computer interface with attention variations"
2018: Abidemi Bolu Ajiboye, Francis R. Willett, Daniel R. Young, William D. Memberg, Brian A. Murphy, Jonathan P. Miller, Benjamin L. Walter, Jennifer A. Sweet, Harry A. Hoyen, Michael W. Keith, Paul Hunter Peckham, John D. Simeral, John P. Donoghue, Leigh R. Hochberg, Robert F. Kirsch
 "Restoring Functional Reach-to-Grasp in a Person with Chronic Tetraplegia using Implanted Functional Electrical Stimulation and Intracortical Brain-Computer Interfaces"
2019: Sergey D. Stavisky, Francis R. Willett, Paymon Rezaii, Leigh R. Hochberg, Krishna V. Shenoy, Jaimie M. Henderson
 "Decoding speech from intracortical multielectrode arrays in dorsal motor cortex"
2020: Francis R. Willett, Donald T. Avansino, Leigh Hochberg, Jaimie Henderson, Krishna V. Shenoy
 "A High-Performance Handwriting BCI"
2021: Thomas Oxley, Nicholas Opie
 "Stentrode, a component of the Synchron brain computer interface (BCI)"

Associated events 
There are also some other awards for BCI research. For example, the Berlin BCI group has hosted several Data Analysis Competitions. These competitions provide data from different types of BCIs (such as P300, ERD, or SSVEP), and competitors attempt to develop data analysis algorithms that can most accurately classify new data. The recently announced HCI Challenge instead focuses on improving the human-computer interaction within BCIs, such as through more natural and friendly interfaces. The X-Prize Foundation lists X-Prizes for BCI and Enduring Brain Computer Communication as “Concepts Under Consideration". The Gao group at Tsinghua University in Beijing coordinated an online BCI competition at a conference that they hosted in 2010, and hosted a second competition in 2012. The Annual BCI Research Award is the only general award open to any facet of BCI research.

References 

Brain–computer interfacing
Science and technology awards